Senator Forward may refer to:

Chauncey Forward (1793–1839), Pennsylvania State Senate
William A. Forward (1812–1865), Florida State Senate